Serena Williams was the defending champion, but was forced to withdraw due to a left knee injury.

Amélie Mauresmo won in the final 6–4, 6–1, against Jennifer Capriati.

Seeds
The top eight seeds received a bye into the second round. 

  Serena Williams (withdrew due to a left knee injury)
  Jennifer Capriati (final)
  Jelena Dokić (semifinals, retired due to a right thigh strain)
  Kim Clijsters (third round)
  Justine Henin (quarterfinals)
  Martina Hingis (quarterfinals)
  Amélie Mauresmo (champion)
  Daniela Hantuchová (semifinals)
  Elena Dementieva (second round)
  Silvia Farina Elia (second round)
  Anastasia Myskina (first round)
  Dája Bedáňová (second round)
  Anna Smashnova (first round)
  Anne Kremer (first round)
  Lisa Raymond (first round)
  Chanda Rubin (second round)

Draw

Finals

Top half

Section 1

Section 2

Bottom half

Section 3

Section 4

External links
WTA Draw and Qualifying Draw
ITF Draw and Qualifying Draw

Rogers ATandT Cup
2002 Canada Masters and the Rogers AT&T Cup